The 2013–14 Moldovan Cup is the 23rd season of the Moldovan annual football tournament. The competition began on 24 August 2013 with the First Preliminary Round and will end with the final held in May 2014. The winner of the competition will qualify for the first qualifying round of the 2014–15 UEFA Europa League.

First Preliminary Round
Entering this round are 24 clubs from the Moldovan "B" Division. These matches took place on 24, 25 and 28 August 2013.

|}

Second Preliminary Round
The 12 winners from the previous round and 2 clubs from the Moldovan "B" Division entered this stage of the competition. These matches took place on 31 August and 1 September 2013.

|}

First round
In this round enter teams from "A" Division. They will play against 7 winner teams from the second preliminary round. These matches took place on 14–15 September 2013.

|}

Second round

|}

Third round
These matches took place on 25 and 26 March 2014.

|}

Quarter-finals
This round featured the eight winners from the previous round. The matches were played on 15 April 2014.

|}

Semi-finals
This round featured the four winners from the previous round. The matches were played on 6 & 7 May 2014.

|}

Final
This round featured the two winners from the previous round. The match were played on 25 May 2014.

Top goalscorers

Updated to matches played on 7 May 2014.

Hat-tricks

References

External links
Cupa Moldovei 2013-2014 la soccerway

Moldovan Cup seasons
Cup
Moldova